David Patton may refer to:

David Henry Patton (1837–1914), American congressman
David Patton (baseball) (born 1984), Major League Baseball pitcher

See also
David Patten (disambiguation)
David Paton (disambiguation)